Ntombela is a South African name that may refer to
Given name
Ntombela kaMalandela, 17th century proto-chieftain of the Zulu nation 

Surname
Alfred Ntombela (born 1972), South African actor
Sisi Ntombela (born 1957), South African politician 
Sthembiso Ntombela (born 1982), South African football defender